Werner Sülberg (born 8 August 1950) is a German sailor. He competed in the Finn event at the 1976 Summer Olympics.

References

External links
 

1950 births
Living people
German male sailors (sport)
Olympic sailors of West Germany
Sailors at the 1976 Summer Olympics – Finn
Sportspeople from North Rhine-Westphalia